Yopougon FC is an Ivorian football club based in Yopougon. Currently, the club formerly known as Oryx FC de Yopougon plays in Ivory Coast's second Division Poule Abidjan.

Current squad
As of July 2009

Football clubs in Abidjan
1987 establishments in Ivory Coast
Association football clubs established in 1987